The 1957 Tour de France was the 44th edition of the Tour de France, taking place from 27 June to 20 July.

The 1957 Tour was the first win for Jacques Anquetil, who won the Tour five times over his career.

The French national team was very successful in the 1957 Tour de France; not only did they provide the winning cyclist, they also won the team classification, and almost every daily team classification. They lost only one cyclist (the previous year's winner Roger Walkowiak), and had the stage winner 12 times. They had Forestier winning the points classification, and Bergaud second in the mountains classification. Only once they did not have the yellow jersey for the leader in the general classification, when Barone took it after the seventh stage.

Innovations and changes

The Tour organisation had a conflict with the French television, and as a results there had almost been no live television coverage of the 1957 Tour de France. At the last moment the organisers and the television agreed on how much the television would pay for the right to cover the Tour, and the race was broadcast.
For the other journalist, the conditions improved: a mobile press room with modern communication equipment was installed, so the journalists had the best conditions to report.

The cut-off time, which had been set at 10% of the winner in 1956, was reduced to 8% of the winner in 1957. In the seventh and eighth stage it would be 10% of the winner, while in stages 10, 11, 16, 17 and 18 the cut-off time would be 12% of the winner. In each stage, if the number of cyclists removed from the race would be more than 15% of the cyclists that started the stage, the cut-off time would be increased by 2%. The goal of this reduction in cut-off time was to make the race tougher.

For the first time since the introduction of the national team format in 1930, the riders were allowed to have advertising on their jerseys.

Teams

The teams entering the race were:

 France
 Belgium
 Italy
 Netherlands
 Spain
 Luxembourg/Mixed
 Switzerland
 West
 South-East
 North-East/Centre
 South-West
 Île-de-France

Pre-race favourites

The route of the 1957 Tour de France contained many mountains, so mountain specialists Charly Gaul and Federico Bahamontes were considered favourites. Gaul, had requested to ride in the Dutch team, but this was not allowed.

Louison Bobet and Raphael Géminiani, two important French cyclists, did not race in 1957, so the French team needed new stars. The team was then built around young Jacques Anquetil, who had broken the hour record earlier that year.

The riders who had been favourites in previous years had stopped (Fausto Coppi), had lost their greatness (Hugo Koblet), or had chosen not to participate (Louison Bobet). As a result, there was no outspoken favourite.
Roger Walkowiak, who had won the previous edition, had not shown good results since. Charly Gaul had lost the 1957 Giro d'Italia when he was almost sure of winning it, so he was not considered to be in great form. Gastone Nencini, who won the 1957 Giro, was not considered constant enough. The Spanish team was considered the best Spanish team ever, but they were more favourite for the mountain classification than for the general classification. And the Belgian team was focussed around Jan Adriaensens.

Route and stages
The 1957 Tour de France started on 27 June, and had two rest days, in Thonon-les-Bains and Barcelona, although the second rest day had a short time trial of less than 10 km.

Every stage had a winning cyclist (the cyclist who crossed the finish line first, or in case of a time trial who took the shortest time to complete the course) and a team that wins the daily team classification (the team of which the three best cyclists had the lowest accumulated time). The cyclist who wins the stage therefore is not always part of the team that wins the daily team classification.  In 1957, the split stages were numbered differently: the third stage consisted of the team time trial and the stage from Caen to Rouen but they were not called 3a and 3b; the fifteenth stage was only the stage from Perpignan to Barcelona, and the short individual time trial was referred to as the time trial between stage 15 and 16, without number.

Race overview

The first stage was won by André Darrigade, who had also won the first stage in the previous edition. The first stages were run in hot weather, and many cyclists had to give up. After six stages, there were only 83 cyclists remaining, from the 120 that started.

In the second stage, Darrigade's teammate Privat took over the yellow jersey. The Luxembourg favourite, Charly Gaul, abandoned on that stage due to sickness.

In the fifth stage, French cyclist Jacques Anquetil took the lead in the general classification, so in the sixth stage he wore the yellow jersey for the first time in his career. It was too early in the race to defend that jersey, so two days later he allowed regional cyclist Nicolas Barone to take the yellow jersey. One day later the French national team took back the yellow jersey, when Jean Forestier took the lead by 15 minutes.

In the ninth stage, Spanish climber Bahamontes abandoned. In stage 10, the first mountain stage, Anquetil took the lead back. Although Gastone Nencini won the stage, Anquetil was only one and a half minute behind, which was enough. In the second mountain stage the riders remained calm, as the French team was superior and dominated the race.

In the second part of the fifteenth stage, a short time trial of 10 km, Anquetil won his first time trial in the Tour de France.

In the Pyrenées from stage 16 to stage 18, the attack on Anquetil's leading position did not take place. In stage 16, the weather had turned bad, with coldness, rain, hail and fog, which made the course dangerous. Several cyclists fell: Nello Lauredi broke his wrist and abandoned the race, and Stanislas Bober had to abandon due to a shoulder injury. The main victims of the bad weather were reporter Alex Virot and his motor cyclist René Wagner, who fell from their motor; Virot died on the spot, and the motor cyclist on the way to the hospital. It was the only accident that Wagner ever had in his career.

Before stage 18, the French team had the first three places in the general classification with Anquetil, Forestier and Mahé. In stage 18, the last mountain stage, Anquetil was in good shape, and he attacked early on. But in the food zone he missed his food bag, and some time later he was out of energy. Several cyclists passed him, but later in the stage Anquetil got help and finished only two and a half minutes after the winner Nencini.

Marcel Janssens and Adolf Christian were in the leading group, while Forestier and Mahé lost considerable time, so Janssens and Christian took the podium places. Anquetil was still leading, and nobody doubted that he would win the race, especially because there was still an individual time trial coming up, Anquetil's specialty. And indeed, Anquetil won that time trial with a margin of more than two minutes.

Classification leadership and minor prizes

The time that each cyclist required to finish each stage was recorded, and these times were added together for the general classification. If a cyclist had received a time bonus, it was subtracted from this total; all time penalties were added to this total. The cyclist with the least accumulated time was the race leader, identified by the yellow jersey. Of the 120 cyclists that started the 1957 Tour de France, 56 finished the race.

The points classification in 1957 was calculated in the same way as since the introduction in 1953, following the calculation method from the Tours de France from 1905 to 1912. Points were given according to the ranking of the stage: the winner received one points, the next cyclist two points, and so on. These points were added, and the cyclist with the fewest points was the leader of the points classification. In 1957, this was won by Jean Forestier with 301 points. Over 22 stages (including two split stages), this meant that his average stage finish was approximately place 14.

Points for the mountains classification were earned by reaching the mountain tops first. The system was almost the same as in 1956: there were three types of mountain tops: the hardest ones, in category 1, gave 10 points to the first cyclist, the easier ones, in category 2, gave 6 points to the first cyclist, and the easiest ones, in category 3, gave 3 points. Gastone Nencini won this classification.

The team classification was calculated as the sum of the daily team classifications, and the daily team classification was calculated by adding the times in the stage result of the best three cyclists per team. It was won by the French team, with a large margin over the Italian team. The Luxembourg/Mixed team finished with only one cyclist, so they were not included in the team classification.

In addition, there was a combativity award given after each stage to the cyclist considered most combative. The split stages each had a combined winner. The decision was made by a jury composed of journalists who gave points. The cyclist with the most points from votes in all stages led the combativity classification.Nicolas Barone won this classification, and was given overall the super-combativity award. The Souvenir Henri Desgrange was given in honour of Tour founder Henri Desgrange to the first rider to pass a point by his final residence, the "Villa Mia" in Beauvallon, Grimaud, on the French Riviera on stage 12. This prize was won by Jean Stablinski.

Final standings

General classification

Points classification

Mountains classification

Team classification

Combativity classification

Aftermath
Jacques Anquetil would later win the Tour de France four more times.

From 1960 to 1967, the "Alex Virot award" was given to the most loyal cyclist, named after the journalist who died during the 1957 Tour de France.

Further reading

Notes

References

Bibliography

External links

 
1957 in French sport
1957
1957 in road cycling
June 1957 sports events in Europe
July 1957 sports events in Europe
1957 Challenge Desgrange-Colombo